Andrew Ken Thomas (born January 22, 1999) is an American football offensive tackle for the New York Giants of the National Football League (NFL). He played college football at Georgia and was selected by the Giants fourth overall in the 2020 NFL Draft.

High school career 
Thomas attended Pace Academy in Atlanta. Following his high school career, Thomas played at the Army All-American Game. He committed to Georgia on July 10, 2016, choosing the Bulldogs over offers from Alabama, Auburn, Florida and others.

College career 
Thomas started every game at right tackle his true freshman season, earning him a Freshman All-American accolade after the conclusion of the season. Thomas switched to left tackle for his sophomore season. He injured his left ankle playing South Carolina, and didn't play the following game against Middle Tennessee. During the next two games, Thomas worked his way back to full participation, though he was forced to wear a brace after re-injuring the ankle later in the season.  After helping to pave the way for 331 rushing yards against Kentucky, Thomas was named the SEC offensive lineman of the week. He was named a first-team All American and to the first-team All-SEC after the season.

Thomas was also invited to the NCAA Elite Football Synopsium in the winter following his sophomore season; the program helps athletes prepare for the transition from college to the NFL. Before his junior season, Thomas projected out as a potential first-round pick in the 2020 NFL Draft if he chose to leave Georgia after his junior year. On December 17, 2019, Thomas announced that he would forgo his senior year and enter the 2020 NFL Draft, thus also skipping the 2020 Sugar Bowl.

Professional career

Thomas was selected by the New York Giants with the fourth overall pick in the 2020 NFL Draft.

Thomas played left tackle for the first five weeks of his rookie season. Thomas was benched for Matt Peart during their Week 6 match against Washington because he arrived late for a team meeting. He ended up starting the remainder of the season at left tackle.

Thomas entered the 2021 season as the Giants starting left tackle. He suffered an ankle injury in Week 6 and was placed on injured reserve on October 19, 2021. On November 22, 2021, Thomas was activated from injured reserve. The same day, Thomas scored his first career touchdown, a two-yard reception, against the Tampa Bay Buccaneers in the Giants' Week 11 game. In February 2022, Thomas underwent surgery to repair the same left ankle that he had injured earlier in the season.

References

External links 
 
 New York Giants bio
 Georgia Bulldogs bio

1999 births
Living people
People from Lithonia, Georgia
Sportspeople from DeKalb County, Georgia
American football offensive tackles
Players of American football from Georgia (U.S. state)
Georgia Bulldogs football players
All-American college football players
New York Giants players